Otto Friedrich von Buchheim or Otto Friedrich von Puchheim (3 April 1604 – 3 April 1664) was a Roman Catholic prelate who served as Bishop of Ljubljana (1641–1664).

Biography
Otto Friedrich von Buchheim was born in Vienna, Austria on 3 April 1604. On 15 April 1641, he was appointed during the papacy of Pope Urban VIII as Bishop of Ljubljana. On 21 April 1641, he was consecrated bishop by Giovanni Battista Maria Pallotta, Cardinal-Priest of San Silvestro in Capite, with Alfonso Gonzaga, Titular Archbishop of Rhodus, and Patrizio Donati, Bishop of Minori, serving as co-consecrators. He served as Bishop of Ljubljana until his death on 3 April 1664.

See also 
Catholic Church in Slovenia

References 

17th-century Roman Catholic bishops in the Holy Roman Empire
Bishops appointed by Pope Urban VIII
1604 births
1664 deaths